Below is a list of newspapers published in Liechtenstein.

Liechtensteiner Vaterland
Liechtensteiner Volksblatt

Liechtenstein
Newspapers